Scott Lipsky and Rajeev Ram were the defending champions but lost in the semifinals.
Mark Knowles and Xavier Malisse defeated Kevin Anderson and Frank Moser 6–4, 1–6, [10–5] in the final.

Seeds

Draw

Draw

External links
 Main draw

SAP Open - Doubles
2012 Doubles
2012 SAP Open